Ronald Vander Kelen (November 6, 1939 – August 14, 2016) was an American football quarterback. He played at the collegiate level at the University of Wisconsin–Madison and is best known for his MVP performance in the 1963 Rose Bowl, where he broke several Rose Bowl records, some of which still stand. In that game, he orchestrated a legendary fourth quarter comeback attempt against the USC Trojans in the first #1 (USC) versus #2 (Wisconsin) bowl game in college football history. Vander Kelen was inducted into the Rose Bowl Hall of Fame in 1991.

Early life
Vander Kelen was born on November 6, 1939 in Preble, Wisconsin, now part of Green Bay. He graduated from Preble High School in 1958.

College career
Vander Kelen played at the collegiate level at the University of Wisconsin–Madison and is best known for his MVP performance in the 1963 Rose Bowl, where he broke several Rose Bowl records, some of which still stand. In that game, he orchestrated a legendary fourth quarter comeback attempt against the USC Trojans in the first #1 (USC) versus #2 (Wisconsin) bowl game in college football history.

In August 1963, he was named the starter in the Chicago College All-Star Game (a game which pitted college all-stars selected from the graduating class from the previous season against the NFL champion)  over a group of quarterbacks which included 1962 Heisman Trophy winner Terry Baker. The college all-stars defeated the Green Bay Packers 20-17, with a 74-yard touchdown completion to his college teammate, Pat Richter, providing the winning touchdown. Vander Kelen was named the game MVP. The 1963 game would prove to be the last time the college all-stars defeated the NFL champion in this series.

NFL career
He was not drafted in the 1963 NFL Draft and drafted in the 21st round of the 1963 AFL Draft by the New York Jets. He entered into a contract with the NFL's Minnesota Vikings as an undrafted free agent.  He was the backup to Fran Tarkenton from 1963 to 1966 and competed for the starting position after Tarkenton was traded to the New York Giants in 1967. Vander Kelen was then traded to the Atlanta Falcons, but never played a regular season game. Vander Kelen also saw playing time in the CFL with the 1968 Calgary Stampeders.

Death
He died at the age of 76 on August 14, 2016.

References

External links
 Ron Vander Kelen at Pro-Football-Reference.com
 
 UW-Madison Archives 1963 Rose Bowl photostream at Flickr

1939 births
2016 deaths
American football quarterbacks
Minnesota Vikings players
Wisconsin Badgers football players
Sportspeople from Green Bay, Wisconsin
Players of American football from Wisconsin